John Blackburn (born 16 January 1976 in Luton, England) is known as a member of Skin's backing band as the bass and keyboard player.  His first gig with Skin was on the V Stage for the V Festival in 2003.

Blackburn also played with Joe Strummer & The Mescaleros, filling in for Scott Shields on the 2000 tour supporting The Who during the UK leg, and is featured as a Mescalero in A. Davie's book Joe Strummer & The Mescaleros. Vision of a Homeland.

Blackburn and his family now live in Auckland, New Zealand.

References
 Joe Strummer & The Mescaleros. Vision of a Homeland. Anthony Davie: Effective Publishing, 2004. 

1976 births
Living people
People from Luton
English male guitarists
Male bass guitarists
21st-century English bass guitarists
21st-century British male musicians